Novica Nikčević (born 7 October 1972) is a retired Slovenian footballer who played as a forward. He is currently the assistant coach of Darko Milanič at Slovan Bratislava.

Playing career
Nikčević played for a number of Slovenian clubs throughout his career. He was Slovenian PrvaLiga top scorer in the 1998–99 season with 17 goals. Between 1999 and 2000, he played for the Belgian club KSC Lokeren. He also played with NK Istra in the Croatian First League.

Coaching career

After retiring as a player, he became a football coach. In 2007, he was appointed the sporting director of ND Gorica where he linked up with manager Darko Milanič. He later became assistant manager at FC Koper in July 2012. He joined Milanič at SK Sturm Graz where he became his assistant manager in 2013.

On 23 September 2014, Nikčević was appointed the new assistant manager of Leeds United on a two-year deal, joining manager Darko Milanič from SK Sturm Graz. When Milanič was dismissed after six games in charge, Nikčević also left the club.

References

External links
PrvaLiga profile 

1972 births
Living people
Slovenian people of Serbian descent
Slovenian footballers
Association football forwards
FK Zemun players
NK Istra players
NK Celje players
ND Gorica players
NK Olimpija Ljubljana (1945–2005) players
Slovenian expatriate footballers
Expatriate footballers in Croatia
Expatriate footballers in Belgium
Slovenian expatriate sportspeople in Croatia
Slovenian expatriate sportspeople in Belgium
K.S.C. Lokeren Oost-Vlaanderen players
NK Mura players
FC Koper players
Slovenian PrvaLiga players
Croatian Football League players
Belgian Pro League players
Slovenian expatriate sportspeople in Austria
Slovenian expatriate sportspeople in England
Slovenian expatriate sportspeople in Slovakia
Leeds United F.C. non-playing staff